Albert van der Sandt Centlivres (13 January 1887 – 19 September 1966), was the Chief Justice of South Africa from 1950 to 1957.

Biography 
Centlivres was born in Newlands, Cape Town, the son of Frederick James Centlivres and Albertina de Villiers. He was educated at the South African College School, South African College (now the University of Cape Town), where he took honours in Classics, and New College, Oxford, where he was a Rhodes Scholar and read Law, graduating BA and BCL. He was called to the bar by the Middle Temple in 1910 and admitted as an advocate of the Cape provincial division in 1911. During the First World War, he served in South-West Africa as a private. He became a King's Counsel in 1927.

In 1935 he was appointed a judge of the Cape Provincial Division, and in 1939 he became a Judge of Appeal in the Appellate Division, South Africa's highest court. He was best known for his judgments during the Coloured vote constitutional crisis, in which he rebuffed the government's attempts at disenfranchising non-white voters in the Cape Province.

Centlivres was Chancellor of the University of Cape Town from 1950 until his death in 1966. The Centlivres Building on the university's upper campus is named after him.

The painting Portrait of Albert van de Sandt Centlivres by Neville Lewis was burned by demonstrators during the Rhodes Must Fall upheaval at the University of Cape Town in February 2016.

References

External links
List of archive material

Chief justices of South Africa
1887 births
1966 deaths
Alumni of New College, Oxford
20th-century King's Counsel
South African Queen's Counsel
South African Rhodes Scholars
Members of the Middle Temple
Chancellors of the University of Cape Town
South African judges